Due to past doping rules violations by the Russian Athletics Federation, the IAAF classified Russian athletes at the 2018 European Athletics Championships as "Authorized Neutral Athletes" instead of counting them as Russian participants.

The IAAF initiated the removal of Russian athletes from international competitions in November 2015 due to the doping scandal in RusFA. This decision was upheld in a 27 July 2018 decision at the IAAF Council, despite the compliance by the Russian side of most of the obligations delegated to it by the IAAF.

At the same time, the IAAF allows several Russian athletes to participate in the international competitions, where they would be considered neutral athletes. Thirty of them were allowed by the organizers to participate in the 2018 European Athletics Championships.

Medals

Results

Men
Track & road events

Field Events

Combined events – Decathlon

Women
Track & road events

Field Events

Key
Q = Qualified for the next round
q = Qualified for the next round as a fastest loser or, in field events, by position without achieving the qualifying target
N/A = Round not applicable for the event
Bye = Athlete not required to compete in round

References

Nations at the 2018 European Athletics Championships
2018
Independent athletes
European Athletics Championships
Authorised Neutral Athletes